Ali Tabrizi (fl. late 14th/early 15th century) was an Iranian woodcarver who is credited with making the doors of the mausoleum of Ottoman sultan Mehmed I (r. 1413–1421) in Bursa, known as the Green Tomb. Ali Tabrizi was the son of a certain Hajji Ahmad. He was amongst a number of Iranian craftsmen who had been invited by the main architect of the tomb, Hacı Ivaz Pasha, to come to Bursa in order to build the Complex of Mehmed I. He may have also carved the other doors and shutters found at the tomb complex, as well as the doors at the Bayezid Pasha mosque in Amasya. However, this remains uncertain.

Sources
 
 
 

14th-century births
15th-century deaths
14th-century Iranian people
15th-century Iranian people
Iranian woodcarvers
Iranian expatriates in the Ottoman Empire